European Journal of Archaeology is an international, peer-reviewed academic journal of the European Association of Archaeologists. Since 2017, it has been published by Cambridge University Press. The journal was entitled the Journal of European Archaeology (1993–1997). The journal publishes archaeological research in and around Europe. The journal was published previously by SAGE, Maney and Taylor & Francis. The Journal contains open access articles.

Editors 
The following persons are or have been editors:

 John Chapman (1998-2001)
 Mark Pearce (2002-2004)
 Alan Saville (2004-2010)
 Robin Skeates (2011-2019) 
 Catherine Frieman (since 2019)

References

External links 

 Open access articles
 Most cited articles
 European Association of Archaeologists Twitter
 EAA European Association of Archaeologists Facebook page

European history journals
English-language journals
Cambridge University Press academic journals